Phillaur Junction railway station is an important railway station in Jalandhar district, Punjab. Its code is PHR. It serves Phillaur city. The station consists of three platforms. The platforms are well sheltered. It has many facilities including water and sanitation.

Platforms

There are a total of three platforms and five tracks. The platforms are connected by foot overbridge. These platforms are built to accumulate express trains of twenty-four coaches. The platforms are equipped with modern facilities including train arrival and departure display boards. It is a Junction for Nakodar, Lohian Khas and Ferozpur Cantt.

Station layout

See also

References

External links 

 Phillaur Junction Map

Railway stations in Jalandhar district
Firozpur railway division